is a ward of the city of Sakai in Osaka Prefecture, Japan. The ward has an area of 13.24 km² and a population of 39,230. The population density is 2,960 per square kilometer.

The wards of Sakai were established when Sakai became a city designated by government ordinance on April 1, 2006.

This ward includes the former town of Mihara, which joined Sakai by merger on February 1, 2005.

Sources
This article incorporates material from 美原区 (Mihara-ku) in the Japanese Wikipedia, retrieved on June 23, 2009.

External links

Ward office official webpage 

Wards of Sakai, Osaka